The Panckoucke family was a French family engaged in publishing and printing.

 Amélie Panckoucke (1750-1830), writer and salonnière, sister of Charles-Joseph ;
 André Joseph Panckoucke (1703-1753), founder of the Panckoucke bookstore in Lille ; 
 Charles-Joseph Panckoucke (1736-1798), son of André Joseph, writer and publisher ;
 Charles-Louis-Fleury Panckoucke (1780-1844), also writer and publisher, son of Charles-Joseph ;
 Collection Panckoucke, collection familiale de classiques latins ;
 Ernest Panckoucke (1808-1886), son of Charles-Louis, publisher and mayor of Onzain ; 
 Henry Panckoucke (1780-1812), directeur des Domaines in Rome, Placide-Joseph's son and husband of  painted by Ingres ;
 Placide-Joseph Panckoucke (1740-1800), director of the Panckoucke bookstore in Lille, Henry's father.
 Ernestine Panckoucke née Désormeaux (1784-1860), botanical illustrator of François-Pierre Chaumeton's "Flore médicale" (1818)